Sir Thomas Charteris (born Thomas de Longueville; died 1346) styled "of Amisfield", was a Scottish nobleman. He supported the Bruce family and was appointed ambassador to England. In 1342 he was appointed Lord Chancellor of Scotland by David II. He was killed in 1346 at the Battle of Neville's Cross. He was known as the Red Reaver.

His sword is believed to be within Kinfauns Castle.

References

Scottish deaths at the Battle of Neville's Cross
1346 deaths
Lord chancellors of Scotland
Year of birth unknown